Amour toujours is the second studio album by Belgian pop singer Lio and her third LP overall.

Singles

Release information and re-issues
The album was originally released by Ariola Records in 1983. It was re-released in France in 2005 as part of Ze Records's reissue of Lio's discography. This re-issue has four bonus tracks, including the extended version of the single "Zip a doo wah" and the standalone Top 50 hit "Tétéou".

Track listing

Personnel
 Arranged by – Alain Chamfort (tracks: 15), Bruno Coulais (tracks: 1, 4, 6 to 8), Dan Lacksman (tracks: 9), John Sulznick (tracks: 9), Marc Moulin (tracks: 9, 15), Slim Pezin (tracks: 2, 3, 5, 10)
 Artwork by [original art cover design] – Marc Borgers
 Engineer – Ryan Ulyate
 Mastered by [digitally remastered by] – Charlus de la Salle
 Photography – Robert Doisneau
 Programmed by [fairlight programming] – John Kongos
 Supervised by [reissue co-ordinated & produced by] – Michel Esteban

References

1983 albums
Lio albums
Ariola Records albums
ZE Records albums